KGU (760 kHz) is a commercial AM radio station in Honolulu, Hawaii, known as "Hawaii Sports Radio Network".  It is owned by the Salem Media Group and broadcasts a sports radio format, carrying syndicated programming from the SportsMap Radio Network and VSiN Radio.  The radio studios and offices are in Honolulu's Kalihi district, and its transmitter is in the Kakaako neighborhood.

AM 760 is a United States clear-channel frequency, on which WJR in Detroit, Michigan is the dominant Class A station.  There are only 18 stations on 760 AM within the United States.  KGU is far enough away from Detroit that it broadcasts day and night with 10,000 watts, using a non-directional antenna.  Programming is also heard on 250 watt FM translator K236CR at 95.1 MHz.

History
KGU is Hawaii's oldest radio station, founded decades before Hawaii became a state.  It signed on the air on Thursday, May 11, 1922. By the 1930s, KGU was powered at 2,500 watts, broadcasting on 750 kilocycles.  It was owned by the Advertising Publishing Company, carrying programs from the NBC Red Network.  With the enactment of the North American Regional Broadcasting Agreement (NARBA), KGU moved one spot up the dial to 760 kHz.

In April 1935 it was used as a homing beacon by Captain Ed Musick and Fred Noonan during their survey flights of the Pacific in a Pan American World Airways Sikorsky S-42. In 1941, Japanese aviators used the station's signal to achieve radio silence and lead them to their attack on Pearl Harbor; later that day, a KGU reporter broadcast news of the attack nationwide on NBC, a report that was interrupted by a telephone operator.

As network program moved from radio to television in the 1950s, KGU switched to a full service, middle of the road format of popular music, news and sports.  In the early 2000s, the station began playing adult standards.

On December 24, 2010, KGU began simulcasting country music along with sister station 99.5 KHUI, after dropping the Adult Standards format. The FM station took the call sign KGU-FM to match the AM sister. However, after simulcasting for over a month, KGU changed to a Business Talk format on February 1, 2011. The station features programming from the Wall Street Radio Network and CNBC.

In December 2018, the station adopted a Classic Country format branded as "95.1 and AM 760 Honolulu's Real Country".

In April 2021, KGU changed its format from country to all-sports, branded as "Hawaii Sports Radio Network".  It uses programming from the SportsMap Radio Network, based in Houston.

In 2022, KGU became an affiliate of the Motor Racing Network, carrying selected NASCAR Cup Series races.

FM translator
KGU also broadcasts its programming on an FM translator.  This translator gives listeners the ability to listen on FM and hear the station in stereophonic high fidelity sound.

See also
1922 in radio
List of radio stations in Hawaii

References

External links
Station Website
FCC History Cards for KGU

GU
Radio stations established in 1922
1922 establishments in Hawaii
Salem Media Group properties
Radio stations licensed before 1923 and still broadcasting
Sports radio stations in the United States